The 1992 (15th) Stinkers Bad Movie Awards was released by the Hastings Bad Cinema Society in 1993 to honor 1992's worst films. The sole category was Worst Picture. It included a list of films that were considered for the final list, but ultimately failed to make the cut (16 films in total). This was the last year that featured only Worst Picture nominees.

Nominees

Dishonorable Mentions

 Alien 3 (Fox)
 Basic Instinct (TriStar)
 Batman Returns (Warner Bros.)
 The Bodyguard (Warner Bros.)
 Cool World (Paramount)
 Encino Man (Hollywood)
 Final Analysis (Warner Bros.)
 Folks! (Fox)
 1492: Conquest of Paradise (Paramount)
 Frozen Assets (RKO)
 Hoffa (Fox)
 Man Trouble (Fox)
 Medicine Man (Hollywood, Cinergi)
 A Stranger Among Us (Hollywood)
 Twin Peaks: Fire Walk With Me (New Line)
 Wild Orchid II: Two Shades of Blue (Triumph)

References

Stinkers Bad Movie Awards
1992 film awards